Leylan-e Jonubi Rural District is in Leylan District of Malekan County, East Azerbaijan province, Iran. At the National Census of 2006, its population was 13,317 in 3,015 households. There were 13,656 inhabitants in 3,713 households at the following census of 2011. At the most recent census of 2016, the population of the rural district was 14,853 in 4,347 households. The largest of its 14 villages was Shirin Kand, with 2,744 people.

References 

Malekan County

Rural Districts of East Azerbaijan Province

Populated places in East Azerbaijan Province

Populated places in Malekan County